Henry Richards (24 July 1812 - 19 September 1864) was a lieutenant colonel in the British Army, justice of the peace, and deputy lieutenant for the county of Pembrokeshire.

References 

1812 births
1864 deaths
British Army officers
Welsh justices of the peace
Deputy Lieutenants of Pembrokeshire